The Harvard Crimson represented Harvard University in ECAC women's ice hockey during the 2015–16 NCAA Division I women's ice hockey season.

Offseason
August 8: Crimson players Miye D'Oench, Michelle Picard and Emerance Maschmeyer were drafted in the inaugural NWHL draft.

Recruiting

Roster

2015-16 Crimson

Schedule

|-
!colspan=12 style="  style="background:#af1e2d; color:#fff;"| Regular Season

|-
!colspan=12 style="  style="background:#af1e2d; color:#fff;"| ECAC Tournament

Awards and honors

Sydney Daniels, Forward, Second Team All-ECAC  
Miye D'Oench, Forward, Second Team All-ECAC 
Emerance Maschmeyer, Goaltender, Second Team All-ECAC 
Michelle Picard, Defense, Third Team All-ECAC

References

Harvard